The 2005 Canoe Slalom World Cup was a series of eight races in 4 canoeing and kayaking categories organized by the International Canoe Federation (ICF). It was the 18th edition. The series consisted of 4 continental championships (European, Pan American, Oceania and Asian), 3 world cup races and the world championships.

Calendar

Final standings 

The winner of each world cup race was awarded 30 points. Semifinalists were guaranteed at least 5 points and paddlers eliminated in heats received 2 points each. The continental championships had a lesser status with the winner earning 20 points, semifinalists at least 2 points and all others were awarded 1 point for participation. Because the continental championships were not open to all countries, every athlete could only compete in one of them. The world championships points scale was the same as for the world cups multiplied by a factor of 1.5. That meant the world champion earned 45 points, semifinalists got at least 7.5 points and paddlers eliminated in heats received 3 points apiece. If two or more athletes or boats were equal on points, the ranking was determined by their positions at the world championships.

Results

2005 Continental Cup Oceania 

Continental Cup Oceania took place in Mangahao, New Zealand from 29 to 30 January. The C1 event did not count for the world cup and the C2 event was not held.

2005 European Championships 

The European Championships took place at the Tacen Whitewater Course, Slovenia from 24 to 26 June.

2005 Asia Canoe Slalom Championships 

The Asia Canoe Slalom Championships took place in Naein-chun, South Korea from 1 to 2 July.

World Cup Race 1 

The first regular world cup race of the series took place at the Hellinikon Olympic Canoe/Kayak Slalom Centre in Athens, Greece from 8 to 10 July.

World Cup Race 2 

World Cup Race 2 took place at the Augsburg Eiskanal, Germany from 15 to 17 July.

World Cup Race 3 

World Cup Race 3 took place at the Segre Olympic Park in La Seu d'Urgell, Spain from 23 to 24 July.

2005 Pan American Championships 

The Pan American Championships took place on the Kern River in California from 26 to 27 August.

2005 World Championships 

The World Championships took place at the Penrith Whitewater Stadium, Australia from 29 September to 3 October.

References

External links 
International Canoe Federation

Canoe Slalom World Cup
Canoe Slalom World Cup